Closing is a sales term which refers to the process of making a sale.  The sales sense springs from real estate, where closing is the final step of a transaction.  In sales, it is used  more generally to mean achievement of the desired outcome, which may be an exchange of money or acquiring a signature. Salespeople are often taught to think of targets not as strangers, but rather as prospective customers who already want or need what is being sold. Such prospects need only be "closed".

Overview
"Closing" is distinguished from ordinary practices such as explaining a product's benefits or justifying an expense. It is reserved for more artful means of persuasion, which some compare with confidence tricks. For example, a salesman might mention that his product is popular with a person's neighbors, knowing that people tend to follow perceived trends. This is known as the Jones theory.  

In automobile dealerships, a "closer" is often a senior salesman experienced in closing difficult deals.

Closing techniques include major and minor closing questions, for example:
 Minor close: "Mr. Customer, would you prefer lighter or darker flooring in your new home?"
 Minor close: "Mr. Customer, would you like go with standard kitchen countertops or do you prefer to go with the granite upgrade?"
 Major close: "Mr. Customer, now that we've taken care of your flooring and countertop preferences let's step in to my office so that we can wrap up the paperwork on your new home."

Big time pros avoid using the word "closed" as in "the deal is over" unless they have affirmed the sale.
A firm "no" from the customer is never the end of the sales process and thus that buyer/seller has not been closed. 
A true top gun pro will revisit this buyer/seller a countless number of times until the sale is affirmed.

Since fear of rejection is one of the biggest impediments to sales success for many people in sales functions they don't actually ask for the business. Hence the constant search for "closers" in sales recruitment. 

All of the "closing" techniques below are different ways to ask for the business. No matter how skillfully applied the customer has the option to answer "No."

Most common techniques
 Alternative choice close: also called the positive choice close, in which the salesperson presents the prospect with two choices, both of which end in a sale. "Would you prefer that in red or blue?"
Apology close: in which the salesperson apologizes for not yet closing the sale. "I owe you an apology. Somewhere along the line, I must have left out important information, or in some way left you room for doubt. We both know this product suits your needs perfectly, and so the fault here must be with me."
 Assumptive close: also known as the presumptive close, in which the salesperson intentionally assumes that the prospect has already agreed to buy, and wraps up the sale. "Just pass me your credit card and I'll get the paperwork ready."
 Balance sheet close: also called the Ben Franklin close, in which the salesperson and the prospect build together a pros-and-cons list of whether to buy the product, with the salesperson trying to ensure the pros list is longer than the cons.
 Cradle to grave close: in which the salesperson undercuts prospect objections that it is too soon to buy by telling them there is never a convenient time in life to make a major purchase, and they must therefore do it anyway."
  Direct close: in which the salesperson simply directly asks the prospect to buy. Salespeople are discouraged from using this technique unless they are very sure the prospect is ready to commit.
  Indirect close: also known as the question close, in which the salesperson moves to the close with an indirect or soft question. "How do you feel about these terms" or "how does this agreement look to you?" 
  Minor point close: in which the salesperson deliberately gains agreement with the prospect on a minor point, and uses it to assume that the sale is closed. "Would the front door look better painted red? No? Okay, then we'll leave it the colour it is."
  Negative assumption close: in which the salesperson asks two final questions, repeating them until he or she achieves the sale. "Do you have any more questions for me?" and "do you see any reason why you wouldn't buy this product?" This tactic is often used in job interviews.
  Possibility of loss close: also known as the pressure close, in which the salesperson points out that failing to close could result in missed opportunity, for example because a product may sell out or its price rise.
 Puppy dog close: in which the salesperson gives the product to the prospect on a trial basis, to test before a sale is agreed upon.
 Sales contest close: in which the salesperson offers the prospect a special incentive to close, disarming suspicion with a credible "selfish" justification. "How about if I throw in free shipping? If I make this sale, I'll win a trip to Spain."
 Sharp angle close: in which the salesperson responds to a prospect question with a request to close. "Can you get the system up and running within two weeks?" "If I guarantee it, do we have a deal?"
 70/30 rule Close: The 70/30 rule explains exactly how you should talk to a client. The salesperson speaks for the remaining 30% of the time, while the consumer does 70% of the talking. Listening to and understanding the customer's pain areas is essential while selling things.
 Need Close: When you, as a salesperson, discover that your supplied product or service is immediately addressing all of the client's pain concerns, you can use the necessary sales closing strategy. A close is almost certain in this circumstance, but you must maintain your composure and consider the client's requirements.
Trial close:It is a closing strategy used by salesperson to know whether the lead is ready to buy or not. This can be used by asking questions like,' What do you think of this product?', 'How would you prefer to pay?' etc. It is not directly asking to close the sale but to know where we are in the sales process.

Most common counters/deflections
Most delays in closing happen due to loss aversion as a result of information asymmetry and conflict of interest with salesperson. In most transactions, salespersons are not required to act as fiduciary, and hence, are primarily motivated by self interest. In addition to having profit-based sales targets, the salespersons often have commissions tied to sales figures which puts them at odds with customer interest or wellbeing.

 Information: If possible, prepare for sales with the information needed to make decisions. Common information would include customer reviews about the product or service, major competitors or substitutes, market share of the product, personal preferences about the purchase, and access to an advisor or attorney. If possible, ask for any information in advance, and preferably in writing.
 Some specific information that is needed in following situations:
 Real estate investing: Internal Rate of Return.
 Car purchase: Dealer invoice, dealer markup on add-ons and finance products (e.g. dealer Buy rate and Sell rate).
 Stock purchase: Growth in Free cash flow.
 Mutual Fund purchase: All fees and restrictions put by the fund. Expense ratio is the management fees charged on invested capital.
 Annuity products: Real rate of return, nominal rate of return, all fees and restrictions.
 Insurance products: In-network coverage and insurance exclusions.
 Clarify concerns: A good salesperson should be empathetic to the concerns of a prospective buyer and lend an ear to them. Try to have questions to clarify with the salesperson that would enable a smooth sale.
 "Is there a free trial period on this service?"
 "What is the return policy on this product?"
 "What is the warranty like on this product?"
 Express how you feel: Honestly conveying how you feel may enable a good salesperson to better understand and adjust his/her approach to accommodate your needs. For example,
 "Can you please give me some references that would attest to this claim?"
 "I'm with a kid. I would prefer if we could revisit this discussion in an hour."
 Ask for time: In most cases, there is no need to expedite the closing process and it is reasonable to ask for more time. For instance:
 "This is my first quote, let me find competitive quotes and get back to you."
 "The car feels lovely. I need to test drive another car before deciding on the model."
 "I know I have 10 days to make this decision. Let me sleep on it and come back."
 "How does this agreement look to you?" "Let me get it reviewed by my attorney."
 Have reasonable expectations: Some decisions may be outside the control of a salesperson and there is nothing they can do about it. Provide examples of the same or comparable product, price, or concessions that are extended in your situation.
 "I was offered a lower price/interest rate by your competitor. Can you match that?"
 "What makes this service priced higher than your competitor? What am I getting for the price premium."
 Answer question with question: Some sales techniques are so unreasonable that it would help to point that out. For instance:
 "This product meets all your needs, why don't we have a sale?" "Is there a concern with that?" (Consumer laws allow a customer to have final say)
 "If I get you this price, will you buy the car today?" "If I get this price, does that mean I have to blindly accept everything else you add in the purchase contract?"
 "Would you like it in red or blue?" "Are those my only options?"
 Point out assumptions: Some sales techniques have subtle assumptions built into them that can be pointed out.
 "How would you prefer to pay?" "Preferably when I'm ready to finalize the purchase."
 "The discount is only for today; It's better to buy it right now." "I'm guessing discounts are cyclical. I'll revisit it later."
 Be assertive: During exceptionally egregious hard sell, be assertive to wrap up the sale. Be willing to hang up or walk away.

Notes 

Selling techniques